Suhail Abdul Latif Galadari (born July 8, 1977) is an Emirati businessman. He is a Co-Chairman at Galadari Brothers. He is a shareholder via Galadari Printing and Publishing in Khaleej Times, the UAE's Dubai-headquartered prominent English newspaper.

Galadari Brothers LLC has investments in print and online media in the Middle East. Other companies under the Galadari Group in the UAE include Mazda UAE, Baskin Robbins Ice Cream, Galadari Sri Lanka Hotel, Galadari Construction, JCB General heavy equipment. The group also has stakes in Galadari Cement in Karachi Pakistan. Suhail Galadari is also founder of the trading company "Suhail Abdul Latif Galadari Trading Establishment" headquartered in Dubai, UAE. Several top Bollywood stars have accepted his invitations to visit and perform in the UAE.

Suhail inaugurated the state-of-the-art Mazda showroom on Sheikh Zayed Road which strengthened the tie between Galadari Automobiles Co. Ltd. and Mazda Motor Corporation.

Suhail lives in Dubai, UAE, and his group spearhead Khaleej Times was the media partner of Peshawar Zalmi cricket team, which won the 2017 Pakistan Super League title after defeating Quetta Gladiators in Lahore in March. Suhail Galadari also co-owns the Benoni ZALMI SA team franchise.

Personal life
Suhail Galadari is the eldest son of the late Abdul Latif Al Galadari. He completed a part of his education in Dubai (UAE) and London (UK).

Bollywood actors like Ranbir Kapoor, Saif Ali Khan, Akshay Kumar, Salman Khan, Amitabh Bachchan often visit him in the Dubai headquarters of Khaleej Times. Akshay Kumar, Kajal, Anupam Kher promoted Special 26 movie in Dubai with Galadari and his newspaper. He welcomed Saif Ali Khan and Kareena Kapoor in Khaleej Times headquarters on November 7, 2009. Bollywood films and Indian music videos have featured his newspaper and its website and he has also granted permission to Bollywood actor Shah Rukh Khan to use his SL65 Black Series in the film Happy New Year.

References

External links
 
Facebook
Instagram

Emirati businesspeople
1977 births
Living people
Emirati people of Pakistani descent